Goodness was an American rock band from Seattle, Washington, led by Carrie Akre, formerly of Hammerbox and now primarily a solo artist. Goodness featured Akre (vocals), Danny Newcomb (lead guitar), Garth Reeves (guitar), Fiia McGann (bass), and Chris Friel (drums).  Akre, Friel, and Newcomb later joined Mike McCready of Pearl Jam and Rick Friel to form the rock band The Rockfords.

Goodness recorded a version of "Electricity, Electricity" with Mike McCready using the pseudonym "Petster" on electric guitar for the Schoolhouse Rock! Rocks tribute disc on Lava/Atlantic. They released their self-titled debut album in 1995 on Y Records, followed in 1998 by Anthem on Immortal/Epic and later These Days on Good Ink. Two live albums were released via Kufala Recordings in 2004. Goodness toured extensively all over the world, supporting such acts as Pearl Jam, Cheap Trick, and Oasis. They co-headlined a tour with Candlebox.

Discography 
Goodness – 1995
Anthem – 1998
These Days – 1999
Live Seattle July 8, 2004–2005
Live Tacoma, WA 6/19/04 – 2005
Live Seattle 12/03/04 – 2005

References

External links 
 Goodness at AllMusic
Carrie Akre at Myspace

Musical groups from Seattle